A Song Goes Round the World may refer to:
 A Song Goes Round the World (1933 film), a German drama film
 A Song Goes Round the World (1958 film), a West German musical film